Film Critics' Award was one of the awards given to the best Czech motion picture.

Winners

Best documentary

External links

Awards for best film
Czech Lion Awards
Awards established in 1996